En pige uden lige (English: "A girl without equal") is a 1943 Danish family film directed by Jon Iversen and starring Ellen Gottschalch.

Cast
Ellen Gottschalch as Anna Hansen
Peter Malberg as Hans Østermann
Johannes Meyer as Lars Østermann
Rasmus Christiansen as Nikolaj Østermann
Petrine Sonne as Sofie Olsen
Poul Reichhardt as Axel Olsen
Ib Schønberg as Bager Thorvald Christensen
Maria Garland as Ovidia Christensen
Inger Stender as Ella Christensen
Hans Egede Budtz as Sognefoged Niels Nilsen
Svend Bille as Grosserer Frederik Holm
Randi Michelsen as Marie Louise Holm
Sigurd Wantzin as Thomas P. Jensen
Preben Kaas

External links

1943 films
Danish black-and-white films
Films directed by Jon Iversen
ASA Filmudlejning films
Danish drama films
1943 drama films
1940s Danish-language films